Saeed Atcha  (born July 1996), is Chief executive of the youth-led charity Youth Leads UK. Atcha is currently a Deputy Lieutenant of Greater Manchester and a Commissioner of the Social Mobility Commission.

Early life 
Atcha was born in Deane, Bolton. He then moved to Hulton and attended Ladybridge High School. Atcha went on to study Public Relations at Manchester Metropolitan University.

Career 
Atcha founded the charity Youth Leads UK, supporting disadvantaged young people in Greater Manchester to access volunteering opportunities and skills development programmes. He was trustee of the Prince of Wales’ charity Step Up To Serve. Atcha was appointed Deputy lieutenant of Manchester by Lord Lieutenant of Greater Manchester in June 2019. Atcha is currently Associate Non-Executive Director of Pennine Care NHS Foundation Trust  He is also currently trustee of Generation UK & Ireland. Atcha is patron of the East of England's Children's charity, Ormiston Families.

Honours
Atcha was the awarded an MBE for services to young people and the community in Greater Manchester in the 2019 New Year Honours. He was the youngest recipient on the list. Atcha was awarded a Point of Light award by the Prime Minister, David Cameron for his work establishing the Xplode Magazine.

References

1996 births
Living people
English nonprofit executives
Alumni of Manchester Metropolitan University
Deputy Lieutenants of Greater Manchester
People from Deane